The Look-Aside Interface is a computer interface that was specified by an interface interoperability agreement produced by the Network Processing Forum. It specifies the method to interface a Network Processing Element (of which an NPU is an example) to a Network Search Element (of which a CAM is an example). The interface is used by devices that off-load certain tasks from the network processor.

Numerous devices which implement the LA interface have been produced. Companies which have implemented these devices include Integrated Device Technology and Cypress Semiconductor.

External Reference
NPF LA-1 Interface Interoperability Agreement

Networking hardware
Networking standards